Vavdi Dharvala is a town and former Rajput non-salute princely state in Gujarat, western India.

History 
Vavdi Dharvala was a minor princely state, in the Gohelwar prant of Kathiawar, also comprising three more villages, ruled by Gohel Rajput Chieftains.

It had a combined population of 2,007 in 1901, yielding a state revenue of 11,000 Rupees (1903-4, nearly all from land) and a paying a tribute of 1,530 Rupees, to the Gaekwar Baroda State and Junagadh State.

See also 
 Vavdi (disambiguation) for (near-)namesakes

External links and Sources 
History
 Imperial Gazetteer, on dsal.uchicago.edu

Princely states of Gujarat
Rajput princely states